Harikumar Pallathadka (Harikumar P in short) is a prominent Indian Right to Information (RTI) (known as FOI in the west) and Social Activist.

History
He holds an MBA.

He is a National General Secretary of India Against Corruption from September 2013.

Activism

His series of RTI applications on Indian Income Tax system have highlighted the fact that barely 3% of Indians pay income taxes as of 2006. This issue has widely been discussed in the media and forums.

His RTI applications on security of Electronic Voting Machines led to the Election Commission of India to divulge details regarding the EVM's and to publicly release the copy of the expert Committee report on security of EVM's headed by Prof. PV Indiresan.

In January 2008, the Government of India was forced to update and properly maintain the official website of the RTI following the order of the CIC acting upon the complaint of Harikumar. The CIC has also commended the efforts of Harikumar in its order and asked the department to implement and to introduce various public friendly initiatives for the effective implementations of the RTI Act, 2005.

He raised the matter of frequent accidents of Sea Harrier fighter jets with the Indian Navy through media. After that even the media has continued raising the questions of safety of security of older Sea Harrier fighter jets with the Indian Navy. Finally in August 2009, after another crash, The Indian Navy has grounded the entire Sea Harrier fighter jet fleet for probe.

His RTI applications on internal border disputes within India led to the Government of India revealing in 2006 that there were nearly a dozen of unsolved and pending disputes of that type.

His series of RTI applications on Indian prisoners of war has shed light on inconsistencies of official figures between various departments of Government of India, and this has led to various measures being taken by the Government of India in the matter of Indian Prisoners of War.

After an RTI concerning pesticides, 25 pesticides were banned for manufacture, import and use in India which involved a health hazard to human beings, animals and damage to the environment, and others faced partial curbs by the Government of India.

He has also attempted to highlight the problem faced by students due to the existence of more than "200 fake educational institutions" that prey on students in India. He has tried to shed light on various socially relevant subjects including Indians believed to be detained in Pakistani jails.
He has fought many cases against several private universities across various Indian States for the implementation of RTI and public disclosure in the private universities, including the states of Punjab, Nagaland, Meghalaya.

References

Living people
Indian civil rights activists
Indian human rights activists
1984 births
Activists from Kerala
People from Kasaragod district
Right to Information activists